The Church of Jesus Christ of Latter-day Saints in Virginia refers to the Church of Jesus Christ of Latter-day Saints (LDS Church) and its members in Virginia. In 1841, there were 80 members of the Church. It has since grown to 96,748 members in 216 congregations.

Official church membership as a percentage of general population was 1.13% in 2014. According to the 2014 Pew Forum on Religion & Public Life survey, roughly 2% of Virginians self-identified most closely with the Church of Jesus Christ of Latter-day Saints. The LDS Church is the 7th largest denomination in Virginia.

History

In 1841, there were some 80 members of the Church in Virginia.

In 1996, a group of Mormon businessmen acquired Southern Virginia College—a two-year private women's college—and turned it into Southern Virginia University, a four-year, coeducational school with a Brigham Young University-like honor code in Buena Vista.

In 2011, Time magazine profiled the large population of singles, or Young Single Adults, in the DC area—including the new 23rd Street Chapel.

In April 2018, church president Russell M. Nelson announced a new temple to be built in Virginia. The first temple of the church to be built in the state, the temple is located in Glen Allen.

Stakes
LDS stakes are groups of congregations. Wards are medium-sized congregations and branches are small congregations.

Stakes are led by a stake presidency (stake president and two counselors, supported by an executive secretary, a stake clerk, and typically four assistant clerks) and a high council of 12 councilors. Stakes also have presidencies for the Stake Relief Society, Young Women, Young Men, Primary, and Sunday School.

As of February 2022, Virginia had the following stakes (congregations in each stake were listed in page prior and not updated):

Annandale Virginia Stake (8 wards)
Ashburn Virginia Stake (12 wards)
Buena Vista Virginia Stake (8 wards, 2 branches)
Buena Vista Virginia YSA Stake (7 wards)
Centreville Virginia Stake (10 wards, 1 branch)
Chesapeake Virginia Stake (9 wards, 2 branches)
Fredericksburg Virginia Stake (6 wards, 2 branches)
Gainesville Virginia Stake
McLean Virginia Stake (9 wards)
Mount Vernon Virginia Stake (13 wards)
Newport News Virginia Stake (8 wards, 4 branches)
Oakton Virginia (9 wards)

Pembroke Virginia Stake (7 wards, 4 branches)
Richmond Virginia Stake (7 wards, 3 branches)
Richmond Virginia Chesterfield Stake (6 wards, 3 branches)
Richmond Virginia Midlothian Stake (7 wards, 3 branches)
Roanoke Virginia Stake 5 wards, 3 branches)
Stafford Virginia Stake (7 wards, 1 branch)
Virginia Beach Stake (7 wards, 3 branches)
Washington DC YSA South Stake (Stake center located in Arlington, VA)
Waynesboro Virginia Stake (10 wards, 1 branch)
Winchester Virginia Stake  (8 wards, 2 branches)
Woodbridge Virginia Stake (9 wards)

Missions

Temples

See also

Virginia: Religion
Southern Virginia University

References

External links
 Newsroom (Virginia)
 ComeUntoChrist.org Latter-day Saints visitor site
 The Church of Jesus Christ of Latter-day Saints official site

Christianity in Virginia
Latter Day Saint movement in Virginia
Virginia